Bear Creek is a ski resort in Longswamp Township, Berks County, Pennsylvania. The resort opened in 1967 and was known as the Doe Mountain until 1999. It is a year-round resort on more than  that features a variety of activities and amenities.

The longest run is .9 miles in length. The mountain has a total of 21 slopes and seven lifts.

It also features night skiing and snow tubing.

Climate
According to the Trewartha climate classification system, Bear Creek Ski and Recreation Area has a Temperate Continental (Dc) Climate with warm summers (b) at the summit (hot summers (a) at the base), cold winters (o) and year-around precipitation. Dcbo climates are characterized by at least one month having an average mean temperature ≤ , four to seven months with an average mean temperature ≥ , all months with an average mean temperature <  (Dcba at the base ≥ ) and no significant precipitation difference between seasons. During the summer months at Bear Creek Ski and Recreation Area, episodes of extreme heat and humidity can occur with heat index values ≥ . The annual peak in thunderstorm activity is July. During the winter months, episodes of extreme cold and wind can occur with wind chill values < . The average seasonal (Nov-Apr) snowfall total is between 30 and 36 inches (76 and 91 cm). Ice storms and large snowstorms depositing ≥ 12 inches (30 cm) of snow can occur, particularly during nor’easters from December through February.

In popular culture
Bam Margera visited Bear Creek for a portion of his television series, Viva La Bam. During his visit, the band Clutch performed at the bottom of the tubing hill. The resort's name was changed from Doe Mountain as a marketing strategy to avoid being characterized as a small ski area.

The first Tough Mudder event was held at Bear Creek Mountain resort on May 2, 2010. Promoted exclusively through Facebook advertising and word of mouth, the event drew more than 4,500 participants.

References

External links

Official website

1967 establishments in Pennsylvania
Buildings and structures in Berks County, Pennsylvania
Geography of Berks County, Pennsylvania
Ski areas and resorts in Pennsylvania
Tourist attractions in Berks County, Pennsylvania